Highbury is a suburb located in the North Shore of Auckland, New Zealand. It is located on the North Shore and is under the local governance of Auckland Council. The term Highbury is used for the older shopping centre at the junction of Birkenhead Avenue and Mokoia Road.

References

External links
Photographs of Highbury held in Auckland Libraries' heritage collections.

Kaipātiki Local Board Area
Suburbs of Auckland
North Shore, New Zealand
Populated places around the Waitematā Harbour